The Faraday Medal is a top international medal awarded by the UK Institution of Engineering and Technology (IET) (previously called the Institution of Electrical Engineers (IEE)). It is part of the IET Achievement Medals collection of awards. The medal is named after the famous Michael Faraday FRS, the father of electromagnetism. Faraday is widely recognized as a top scientist, engineer, chemist, and inventor. His electromagnetic induction principles have been widely used in electric motors and generators today.

Background
The Faraday medal is the IET's highest honour and one of the world's most prestigious awards for engineers and scientists. Winners include ground-breaking pioneers and inventors. First awarded in 1922, it is one of the oldest medals still being awarded today. The top medal is awarded annually to distinguished individuals who either for notable scientific or industrial achievement in engineering or for conspicuous service rendered to the advancement of science, engineering and technology, without restriction as regards to nationality, country of residence or membership of the Institution. The award was established in 1922 to commemorate the 50th Anniversary of the first Ordinary Meeting of the Society of Telegraph Engineers and is named after Michael Faraday. Each year, the recipient received his/her award at a ceremony held in London that is hosted by the IET.

Winners

First 50 Years (1922–1972)

Next 50 Years (1973–2023)

See also

 Queen Elizabeth Prize for Engineering
 Millennium Technology Prize
 IEEE Medal of Honor 
 Turing Award
 Nobel Prize

References 

British science and technology awards
Awards established in 1922
1922 establishments in the United Kingdom
Institution of Engineering and Technology
Engineering awards
Science and technology awards
International awards
Academic awards